Ahmann is a surname. Notable people with the surname include:

Crissy Ahmann-Leighton (born 1970), American swimmer, and Olympic champion
Erhard Ahmann (1941–2005), German football manager
Jörg Ahmann (born 1966), German beach volleyball player
Mathew Ahmann (1931–2001), American Catholic layman and civil rights activist
Philipp Ahmann (born 1974), German conductor, especially known as a choral conductor

See also
Ahlmann
Ahman